Mieczysław Szostek (20 September 1933 – 16 November 2021) was a Polish doctor and politician.

Biography

References

1933 births
2021 deaths
Members of the Polish Sejm 1985–1989
People from Legionowo